Legacy is the title of a recording by American folk music and country blues artist Doc Watson and David Holt, released in 2002.

This three-disc set includes two CDs of interviews with Watson interspersed with music. Watson discusses his upbringing and career as well as his musical roots. The third disc is a live recording of a concert recorded at the Diana Wortham Theatre in Asheville, NC, in 2001. A 72-page booklet including song notes and rare photographs is also included.

At the Grammy Awards of 2003, Legacy won the 2002 Grammy Award for Best Traditional Folk Album.

Track listing
 "Cousin Sally Brown" (Traditional) – 1:13
 "Interview: I Played Like the Rest of the Boys" – 2:37
 "Interview: Dad Was a Harmonica Player" – 6:33
 "Interview: The King's Treasure" – 6:38
 "Deep River Blues" (Traditional) – 4:02
 "Interview: Cat With Ten Lives	" – 1:54
 "Ruben's Train" (Traditional) –  2:29
 "Interview: Learn to Pick It Good" – 2:32
 "Georgie Buck" (Traditional) – 0:57
 "Darlin' Cory" (Traditional) – 1:15
 "Interview: Doc's First Guitar" – 2:51
 "When the Roses Bloom in Dixieland" (Carter) – 5:52
 "Interview: Leaving Home" – 3:14
 "Never No Mo' Blues" (Jimmie Rodgers) – 1:41
 "Interview: Wood Sheddin'" – 1:49
 "Beaumont Rag" (Traditional) – 2:55
 "Interview: Fingerstyle Guitar" – 0:55
 "Freight Train" (Cotten) – 0:57
 "Sitting on Top of the World" (Sam Chatmon, Walter Vinson) – 0:50
 "Interview: Playin' on the Street" – 2:15
 "Down the Road" (Flatt, Scruggs) – 2:58
 "Bury Me Beneath the Willow" (Carter) – 2:24
 "Interview: The Woman From Wildcat" – 5:32
 "Interview: The Legend of Tom Dooley" – 2:30
 "Tom Dooley" (Traditional) – 3:26
 "Interview: Hitting the Road" – 6:46
 "Interview: Going Solo" – 1:53
 "Interview: Top of the Heap" – 4:50
 "Tennessee Stud" (Jimmy Driftwood)  – 4:37
 "Interview: Building Bridges" – 4:08
 "Ready for the Times to Get Better" (Reynolds) – 1:57
 "Interview: Living the Blues" – 4:37
 "Interview: Blessed" –  0:57
 "Rolling in My Sweet Baby's Arms" – 2:35
 "Whiskey Before Breakfast/Ragtime Annie" (Traditional) – 4:00
 "Shady Grove" (Traditional) – 3:06
 "Whoop 'Em Up Cindy" – 3:07
 "Otto Wood	" – 4:08
 "Interview: Dad Taught Me to Play the Harmonica" – 0:33
 "Old Molly Hare" (Traditional) – 0:54
 "Home Sweet Home" (Traditional) – 3:17
 "Railroad Bill" – 3:00
 "Train That Carried My Girl From Town" – 5:11
 "Walk On" (Brownie McGhee) – 2:31
 "Interview: Bantar Vs. Gitjo" – 1:37
 "Don't Get Weary" – 2:38
 "Black-Eyed Susie" – 2:45
 "The Telephone Girl	 Reid	 2:24
 "Stand By Me" (Ernest Tubb) – 2:22
 "Just to Ease My Worried Mind" (Roy Acuff) – 3:11
 "Raincrow Bill/Hambone Rhythm" (Traditional) – 3:01
 "I Got the Blues and I Can't Be Satisfied" (Traditional) – 4:24

Personnel
Doc Watson – guitar, harmonica, vocals, banjo
David Holt - banjo, guitar, vocals
Richard Watson – guitar, banjo

Production notes
David Holt – producer
Steven Heller – producer, engineer, mastering and mixing
Travis Leonard – assistant engineer
Nathan Milner – assistant engineer
Virginia Callaway – project coordinator
Brad Campbell – editorial assistant

References 

2002 compilation albums
Doc Watson compilation albums